Michael Gallagher is an American guitarist, best known for his work with post-metal band Isis. He joined them in 1999 for their debut LP Celestial, having previously been a member of Cast Iron Hike.  He has an ambient project known as MGR (Mustard Gas & Roses); under this moniker he has released two albums and scored one film.

He plays a '78 Les Paul Custom, which he bought on eBay, through a Fryette Sig:x Amplifier. While playing in Isis he normally tuned his guitar down to (B-F#-B-E-G#-B), like his bandmate Aaron Turner.

Discography

With Cast Iron Hike

 Watch it Burn (1997)
 Cast Iron Hike (1998)

With Isis

 Sawblade (1999)
 Isis / Pig Destroyer (2000) (Split with Pig Destroyer)
 Celestial (2000)
 SGNL>05 (2001)
 Oceanic (2002)
 Panopticon (2004)
 Oceanic: Remixes & Reinterpretations (2004)
 In the Fishtank 14 (2006) (Split with Aereogramme)
 In the Absence of Truth (2006)
 Wavering Radiant (2009)

As MGR

 Nova Lux (2006)
 Wavering on the Cresting Heft (2007)
 22nd of May [OST] (2010)

References

External links
 Creative Eclipse interview with Gallagher
 Interview with Gallagher at PopMatters
 Interview with Gallagher at Punknews

Living people
Isis (band) members
American rock guitarists
American male guitarists
Place of birth missing (living people)
Year of birth missing (living people)
Ipecac Recordings artists